The Watsco Center (originally named the University of Miami Convocation Center) is an 8,000-seat multi-purpose arena on the campus of the University of Miami in Coral Gables, Florida. The venue hosts concerts, family shows, trade shows, lecture series, university events and sporting events, including all University of Miami men's and women's basketball games.

Founding
The arena opened in 2003 and was originally named the University of Miami Convocation Center. The arena is home to the Miami Hurricanes men's and women's basketball teams. Additional events held in the Watsco Center include concerts, sporting events, lectures, award shows, high school graduations, and men's and women's basketball games. It is the largest arena ever built on the University of Miami campus.

In 2005, the arena was renamed the BankUnited Center, after Miami Lakes-based BankUnited. In 2016, Miami-based air conditioning company Watsco acquired the naming rights.

Prior to the opening of the Watsco Center, from 1988 until 2002, the school's basketball teams played their home games at Miami Arena.

U.S. presidential debates
The Watsco Center has hosted two U.S. presidential debates to date:

On September 30, 2004, the University of Miami hosted one of the three nationally televised U.S. presidential debates between presidential candidates George W. Bush and John Kerry during the 2004 presidential election at the Watsco Center. The debate, which was moderated by Jim Lehrer of PBS NewsHour, was viewed by 62.5 million people.

On March 10, 2016, the University of Miami hosted the 2016 Republican presidential primary's twelfth and final debate at Wastso Center, which aired nationally on CNN and featured Republican presidential candidates Ted Cruz, John Kasich, Marco Rubio, and Donald Trump.

Ranking
The 2007 issue of Venues Today, an entertainment industry publication, reports that the Watsco Center outperformed all but one other venue in Florida in its size category for number of concerts and touring events held in 2006.

See also
 List of NCAA Division I basketball arenas

References

External links
Official Web Site
BankUnited Center - Traditions - University of Miami Hurricanes

Coral Gables, Florida
2003 establishments in Florida
Basketball venues in Florida
Buildings and structures in Coral Gables, Florida
College basketball venues in the United States
Esports venues in Florida
Indoor arenas in Florida
Miami Hurricanes basketball venues
Mixed martial arts venues in Florida
Music venues completed in 2003
Music venues in Florida
Sports venues completed in 2003
Sports venues in Florida
University of Miami